The Birmingham Council of Social Service was a voluntary body that operated in Birmingham, England during the 1940s. Some of the first Citizens Advice Bureau in the United Kingdom were offshoots of the BCSS.

References

History of Birmingham, West Midlands